Robin's Nest ( (former name:)) is a hill located in northeastern Hong Kong, south of the border between Hong Kong and Shenzhen in the New Territories. Robin's Nest is the 55th tallest hill in Hong Kong.

The name Hung Fa Leng does not translate directly as 'Robin's Nest' but as 'Red Flower Ridge'.

In 2017, the Hong Kong Government announced that it was planning to designate the area as a country park, called Robin's Nest Country Park. This proposed designation was made in June 2019. As of 2021, the final legislative work on the designation is still in progress.

See also
Hung Fa Chai, a nearby hill
List of mountains, peaks and hills in Hong Kong
Ma Tseuk Leng, a nearby area and village, which has the same name as the former Chinese name of Robin's Nest
Lin Ma Hang, a village with an old abandoned lead mine and MacIntosh Fort below Robin's Nest

References

Mountains, peaks and hills of Hong Kong
North District, Hong Kong